The Second Zambezi expedition, from 1858 to 1864,  was launched by the Royal Geographical Society of Britain to explore Southeast Africa for mineral deposits and other natural resources. The expedition led to the establishment of the Central Africa Mission and was under the command of Dr. David Livingstone, who would become famous for his journeys into the interior of Africa.

References

Zambesi
Zambesi
1850s in Africa
1860s in Africa
1850s in the British Empire
1860s in the British Empire
Expeditions from the United Kingdom
Royal Geographical Society
1858 in Africa
1864 in Africa
David Livingstone